Griff is a masculine given name and a surname. It may refer to:

 Griff Allen, American motorsports broadcaster
 Griff Barnett (1884–1958), American actor
 Griff Rhys Jones (born 1953), British comedian, writer and actor
 Griff Norman (1926—2010), Welsh footballer
 Griff Whalen (born 1990), American National Football League player
 Griff Williams (born 1966), American painter
 Ray Griff (1940-2016), Canadian country music singer and songwriter
 Stirling Griff (born 1957), Australian politician
 Zaine Griff (born 1957), New Zealand-born singer and songwriter

Masculine given names